The 1922 Iowa Hawkeyes football team represented the University of Iowa in the 1922 Big Ten Conference football season.  The team was coached by Howard Jones, was co-champion of the Big Ten Conference, and was retroactively selected as the 1922 national champion by the Billingsley Report.

Preseason
Howard Jones was in his seventh year at Iowa in 1922, having coached the Hawkeyes to a 30–14–1 record from 1916 to 1921.  In 1919, end Lester Belding was named All-America, and Belding, quarterback Aubrey Devine, tackle Duke Slater and fullback Fred Lohman were named All-Big Ten. In 1920, Belding, Devine and Slater were named All-Big Ten.  In 1921, Iowa went 7–0 and won the Big Ten championship.  Devine, Slater and fullback Gordon Locke were named All-America, and Devine, Slater, Locke, Belding, center John Heldt, guard Chester Mead and end Max Kadesky were named All-Big Ten.  Devine, his brother Glenn, Slater and Belding graduated in the spring of 1922.  Iowa had a ten-game winning streak going into the 1922 season.

Schedule

Season

Knox
Iowa opened the 1922 season on October 7 with a game against Knox College.  For the second consecutive year, the Hawkeyes crushed Knox.  Final score: 61–0.

Yale
On October 14, Iowa made a trip to New Haven to play Eastern powerhouse Yale.  The Elis had already beaten Bates, Carnegie Tech and North Carolina by a combined score of 79–0.  Yale was coached by the younger brother of Iowa coach Howard Jones, Tad Jones, who had coached the Elis to a 27–5 record from 1916 to 1917 and 1920 to 1922.  Yale had an eleven-game home winning streak at the Yale Bowl.  The Elis had never lost to a team from the West in fifty years of varsity football.

In the first game between Eastern and Western teams of the college football season, Iowa dominated Yale.  The Hawkeyes used only twelve men to the fourteen used by the Elis.  The only scoring drive of the game began late in the first quarter when Yale punted to the Hawkeyes.  An Eli foul put Iowa in the territory of the opposition.  Iowa quarterback Leland Parkin led the Hawkeyes down the field.  On fourth down and goal from the Yale nine, Parkin ran around the right end and dove for the end zone.  He came down a foot short and crawled the rest of the way.  Iowa missed the extra point, but six points ended up being enough to win the game.  The Elis drove inside the Hawkeye twenty twice in the second half, but the drives ended before the Elis could score.  Iowa won the game, 6–0.

Yale lost to a Western team for the first time ever.  The Elis did not lose to another team from the West until they fell to Michigan in 1938.  The Iowa victory made front page headlines across the nation.  The headline of the Chicago Sunday Tribune ran "IOWA ELEVEN SMASHES YALE".  The game was a major turning point in the battle between the East and the West for football supremacy.  The use of the huddle by the Hawkeyes, an idea that was growing popular in the West, was one of the reasons Iowa was able to beat the Elis so impressively.  Iowa City was home to a huge celebration on Saturday night.  Seven thousand students and citizens paraded up and down the streets, shooting off rockets and dancing around bonfires.  The Iowa marching band led the celebration and the crowds were compared to those who would gather in New York City on New Year's Eve.

Illinois
Iowa returned to Iowa City for a game with Illinois on October 21.  It was the first Big Ten game of the season for both teams.  Gordon Locke scored the only Hawkeye touchdown and a safety made the difference in an 8–7 Iowa win.  The Hawkeyes had also defeated the Illini in the 1921 Big Ten opener for both teams.  It was the first time Illinois had lost consecutive Big Ten openers since 1908 and 1909.

Purdue
Purdue was the opponent of Iowa on October 28.  The Boilermakers had not scored a point in their previous two games, having lost to Notre Dame and Chicago by a combined score of 32–0.  The Hawkeyes gave Purdue a third consecutive shutout, beating the Boilermakers 56–0.  It is the worst loss in 110 years of varsity football at Purdue.  Gordon Locke scored two touchdowns for Iowa.

Minnesota
Iowa played their homecoming game on November 11.  William Spaulding brought his first Minnesota team to Iowa City.  The Gophers had suffered their first loss of the season on November 4 to Wisconsin.  The Hawkeyes handed them their second loss of the season, winning 28–14.  Gordon Locke scored three touchdowns in the first half for Iowa.  Heavy rain soaked Iowa Field and turned the dirt roads that led into Iowa City to mud.  Hundreds of cars stalled on the road to Cedar Rapids and thousands of Hawkeye fans were stranded that night.

Ohio State
The first game between Iowa and Ohio State was played in Columbus on November 18.  The Buckeyes became the first team since 1920 to lead the Hawkeyes, but Iowa beat Ohio State 12–9.  Gordon Locke rushed for 126 yards and returned three kicks for 91 yards.  The Hawkeye victory ensured that the Buckeyes would suffer their first losing season since 1898.

Northwestern
Iowa played their final game of the season on November 25 against Northwestern.  Glenn Thistlethwaite was in his first year as the coach of the Purple.  The Hawkeyes beat Northwestern 37–3 to complete a second consecutive perfect season at 7–0.  Gordon Locke scored four touchdowns for Iowa to match his career record.  Locke finished first in the Big Ten in scoring.  His 72 points in conference games was a Big Ten record.

Postseason
Iowa went 7–0 and won a second consecutive Big Ten championship.  Gordon Locke was named All-America, and Locke, guard Paul Minick and tackle George Thompson were named All-Big Ten.  The Hawkeyes won their first three games in 1923 to extend their winning streak to twenty games.  Illinois broke the streak on October 20 when Iowa fell to the Illini in Champaign by the score of 9–6.  The 1923 Illinois team went 8–0 and won the national championship.  They were led by All-American halfback Red Grange, who is widely regarded as one of the greatest football players of all time.  The twenty-game winning streak from 1920 to 1923 is the longest in Iowa history.  The home unbeaten streak of the Hawkeyes reached thirty-one games before Iowa fell to Wisconsin on November 7, 1925, by the score of 6–0.

References

Additional sources
 Hawkeye Archives 
 MacCambridge, M. (2005) ESPN College Football Encyclopedia. New York: ESPN Books. 
 The Gazette (2006) Greatest Moments in Iowa Hawkeyes Football History. Chicago: Triumph Books. 

Iowa
Iowa Hawkeyes football seasons
Big Ten Conference football champion seasons
College football undefeated seasons
Iowa Hawkeyes football